Ariel Behar and Enrique López Pérez were the defending champions but only Behar chose to defend his title, partnering Gonzalo Escobar. Behar lost in the quarterfinals to Gonçalo Oliveira and Andrei Vasilevski.

Oliveira and Vasilevski won the title after defeating Fabrício Neis and Fernando Romboli 6–3, 6–4 in the final.

Seeds

Draw

References

External links
 Main draw

Internazionali di Tennis Città di Vicenza - Doubles
2019 Doubles